Nigusse Bekele is an Ethiopian Olympic middle-distance runner. He represented his country in the men's 1500 meters and the men's 800 meters at the 1980 Summer Olympics. His time was a 3:45.79 in the 1500, and a 1:51.10 in the 800 heats.

References

1959 births
Living people
Ethiopian male middle-distance runners
Olympic athletes of Ethiopia
Athletes (track and field) at the 1980 Summer Olympics